On Better Days and Sin-Eating is the second release by industrial band Amphibious Assault, formed by former Kittie member Fallon Bowman.

Amphibious Assault's second album was completed and originally scheduled for a June, and later, an August, 2005 release. The release was postponed, both times, largely due to Bowman's school schedule. Her scheduled live shows with Pigface were also affected by her school schedule. On January 10, 2007, Bowman announced, on the Amphibious Assault's website, that the second album, On Better Days and Sin-Eating, was now available to purchase. As was the case with the previous album, 2003's District Six, the album was released on the Social Unrest label. Although limited to 500 physical copies, the album was also made available via digital download. Bowman also confirmed that this album would be the last release under the Amphibious Assault name and that a new project, with a different sound, is expected in the future. That project was eventually released as Human Conditional which Bowman released as a solo artist on January 25, 2011. Bowman has since returned to performing under Amphibious Assault with the 2021 release titled Simulacrima.

Track listing
"Mistakes, Breaks, Way Too Late"
"On Better Days and Sin-Eating"
"No Help From Above"
"The Importance of Finding Narcissism"
"Tears in Rain"
"Salute!"
"Love Letters Addressed to Dying"

2007 albums
Amphibious Assault (band) albums